Dick Krzywicki (born Ryszard Lech Krzywicki; 2 February 1947 in Penley, Flintshire) is a Welsh former professional footballer and Wales international. He was born to Polish parents.

During his career he played for West Bromwich Albion, Huddersfield Town, Scunthorpe United, Northampton Town and Lincoln City.

He was the first West Bromwich Albion substitute to enter the field in a League Cup match when he replaced Doug Fraser against Manchester City in October 1966. He went on to score a goal as Albion progressed by a 4–2 scoreline. Krzywicki became the first Albion player to be substituted in an FA Cup game when he made way for Graham Lovett against Colchester United in January 1968.

International career

Krzywicki made his debut for Wales on 22 October 1969 in a 3–1 defeat to East Germany.
His finest moment gaining his 8 caps for Wales was when he scored against the then world champions, England in the 1970 British Home Championship. He made his final appearance on 27 October 1971 in a 1–0 defeat to Czechoslovakia.

Personal life

Krzywicki's daughter Tara played for Wales at international level, winning six caps, before becoming a long-distance runner. His son Nick is a professional golfer.

References

1947 births
Living people
Welsh footballers
Wales international footballers
Wales under-23 international footballers
Sportspeople from Flintshire
Welsh people of Polish descent
British people of Polish descent
West Bromwich Albion F.C. players
Huddersfield Town A.F.C. players
Scunthorpe United F.C. players
Northampton Town F.C. players
Lincoln City F.C. players
English Football League players
Association football midfielders